The first election of regional governors was held on 15 and 16 May 2021, in conjunction with elections of members for the Constitutional Convention and local authorities. The process included the direct election of regional governors for the 16 regions, the largest administrative division of the country. Their term will extend between 17 July 2021 and 6 January 2025. In case none of the candidates received more than 40% of the votes, a second round will be held on 13 June 2021.

The election of regional governors were originally scheduled for 25 October 2020, but the COVID-19 pandemic changed the entire election schedule in Chile, moving the 2020 national plebiscite from 26 April to 25 October. The election of regional governors were moved then to 11 April 2021, extending the term of the mayors elected in the previous election. Due to the pandemic, the election of regional governors (and the concurring other elections) were extended to two days (10 and 11 April) to avoid agglomerations, becoming the first election in Chile to be held in more than one day. Finally, the elections were again postponed to 15 and 16 May 2021 due to a rise in the cases of COVID-19.

The election of regional board members will be held on 21 November 2021, in conjunction with the presidential and parliamentary elections.

Results

Overall

Results per region 

Source: SERVEL (100% counted)

References 

Elections in Chile
2021 elections in Chile
May 2021 events in Chile
Presidency of Sebastián Piñera